Zulfiqar Ali (30 December 1969 – 10 May 2003) was a Pakistani cricketer who played for Multan and Pakistan International Airlines (PIA) in Pakistani domestic cricket. He played as a right-arm fast bowler.

Zulfiqar was born in Pakpattan, Punjab. He made his first-class debut at the age of 15, playing a Patron's Trophy match for Multan against the Karachi Blues in November 1985. Zulfiqar switched to PIA for the 1986–87 season, and appeared for the team in the Patron's Trophy, the Quaid-i-Azam Trophy, the PACO Cup, and the Wills Cup. He took three five-wicket hauls during the season, with a best of 6/38 against Peshawar. Zulfiqar's 1987–88 domestic season was interrupted by his selection for the Pakistan under-19s at the 1988 Youth World Cup in Australia. He appeared in six of his team's nine matches, including the semi-final and final, and took four wickets with a best of 2/20 against Sri Lanka. In a Quaid-i-Azam match against United Bank Limited in February 1989, Zulfiqar took 7/76, the best figures of his first-class career. He played only two more seasons of top-level Pakistani domestic cricket, however, with his final match at that level coming in October 1990. In total, he took 98 wickets from 29 first-class appearances, as well as 19 wickets from 14 limited-overs matches.

References

External links
Player profile and statistics at CricketArchive
Player profile and statistics at ESPNcricinfo

1969 births
2003 deaths
Multan cricketers
Pakistani cricketers
Pakistan International Airlines cricketers
People from Pakpattan